Craig Abaya is an American multi-artist who served as director of Digital Media & Entertainment Programs for San Francisco State University Extended Learning from 2000 to 2015.

Early life
Abaya is a native of San Francisco's Bernal Heights neighborhood. He became involved in music during childhood, taking up the piano at age six, the drums at age eleven, and the guitar at age twelve. He became involved in film and photography at the age of nine.

At seventeen, Abaya enrolled at San Francisco State University where he proposed and earned a special major in multimedia, combining studies in film, audio, video, computers and electronics.

Music

Abaya is a singer and cites his main instruments as guitar, piano, and drums. He also took up recording from a young age, moving from 2- and 4-track analog tape to ADAT and eventually to DAWs (digital audio workstations). At 17, he formed his first professional band, the grunge/metal trio Apparition. At this time, he also wrote and performed music with the local church youth choir. After disbanding "Apparition," he founded the 4-piece group "The Basics" and later, "Abaya," in an attempt to merge his divergent musical interests. He has won songwriting awards in various genres, including 10 from Billboard Magazine.

References

External links
 
 Craig Abaya's Website
 MacWorld Featured Artist for 2013

American male singer-songwriters
Singer-songwriters from California
Film directors from San Francisco
Film producers from California
Photographers from San Francisco
Living people
San Francisco State University faculty
Year of birth missing (living people)